Ib Niels Carl Glindemann Nielsen (September 27, 1934 – April 5, 2019) was a Danish jazz musician and the leader of the Ib Glindemann Orchestra (a big band modeled after the Stan Kenton Orchestra). Saxophonist Stan Getz frequently appeared with them as a guest star when he was in Europe.

Discography 
 Fontana presenting Ib Glindemann and his orchestra (Fontana, 1963)

 Four Suites with Wolfgang Kafer and Kim Holst (Chappell Recorded Music Library, 1984)
 Industrial / Activity - Holiday Music with Wolfgang Kafer (Chappell Recorded Music Library, 1985)
 Acoustic/Woodwind/Brass with Robert Farnon (Carlin Recorded Music Library, 1990)
 The Man Who Wanted to Be Guilty/The Traitors (Olufsen, 1991)
 Talk of the town (Olufsen, 1992) with DR Big Band – recorded in 1988
 Ping Pong (Mega, 1996)
 A String of Pearls (Mega, 1997)
 Swing Shoes (Mega, 2000)
 50 Years on Stage  Featuring Gitte Hænning (Edel-Mega, 2002)
 Fontana Presenting Ib Glindemann & His 1963 (Universal, 2004)
 Turn on the Heat (Little Beat, 2009)

References

External links
 
 
 Review — Swing Shoes / A String of Pearls / Ping-Pong in All About Jazz (July 1, 2001)
 Review — 50 Years on Stage in All About Jazz (November 1, 2002)

Jazz bandleaders
Danish jazz musicians
1934 births
2019 deaths
DR Big Band members
Olufsen Records artists
Capitol Records artists